Odžak is a town and municipality located in Posavina Canton of the Federation of Bosnia and Herzegovina, an entity of Bosnia and Herzegovina. It is situated in the northern part of Bosnia and Herzegovina, near the river Sava,  from the border with Croatia. The name is derived from Turkish Ocak, during its time as a frontier town of the Ottoman Empire, and means "fireplace" in Turkish and "chimney" in modern Serbo-Croatian.

The town of Odžak is notable for being the battlegrounds of the last battle in Europe of World War II, fought between the Croatian Ustaše and Yugoslav Partisans.

Demographics

Population

Ethnic composition

Economy 
Before the Breakup of Yugoslavia, over 5,000 people were employed primarily in industry and agriculture. The largest industrial facilities were Strolit with over 700 employees, Energoinvest, Vuntex, and Borovo.

Sports
The town is home to the volleyball club OK Napredak Odžak. The local football club is NK Odžak 102.

References

External links

 
Populated places in Odžak
Cities and towns in the Federation of Bosnia and Herzegovina
Municipalities of the Posavina Canton